Chicanos Por La Causa, or CPLC, is a non-profit organization based in Arizona founded in 1969.  It is a statewide community development corporation (CDC). It has staff of nearly 900 and impacts more than 2,000,000 people every year throughout Arizona, Nevada, New Mexico, Texas, and California.

History 

CPLC was founded in 1969 when young Chicano men and women, hoping to improve the quality of life for Arizona's Mexican American population. Inspired by Dolores Huerta and Cesar Chavez, CPLC advocated for equity in education, politics, and labor conditions. Requested from the parish council of the Historic Sacred Heart Church to utilize Santa Rita Hall for community engagement efforts; the parish council granted them the request at the insistence of parish council member Abraham F. Arvizu, who was subsequently elected to CPLC's Board of Directors. Santa Rita is credited with being the birthplace of CPLC. The National Council of La Raza invested and supported the organization, and with that financial assistance, CPLC implemented programs focusing on bilingual housing referral services for low income communities in South Central Phoenix. In the 1970s, CPLC board member Guadalupe Huerta advocated for increased capacity of senior housing related to the destruction of the Golden Gate Barrio by the City of Phoenix, which led to the development of one of the earliest known senior housing projects in Phoenix, Casa de Primavera.

References

External links 

Chicano
Mexican-American culture in Arizona
Mexican-American organizations
Non-profit organizations based in Arizona